The 2023 New Jersey General Assembly elections will be held on November 7, 2023. New Jersey voters will elect two Assembly members in all of the state's legislative districts for a two-year term to the New Jersey General Assembly.

Incumbents not running for re-election

Democratic
Daniel R. Benson, District 14 (running for Mercer County Executive)
Ralph R. Caputo, District 28 (redistricted into District 34)
Annette Chaparro, District 33 (redistricted into District 32; lost party endorsement)
Sadaf Jaffer, District 16
Mila Jasey, District 27 (redistricted into District 28)
Angelica M. Jimenez, District 32 (redistricted into District 33; running for West New York Board of Commissioners)
Angela V. McKnight, District 31 (running for State Senate)
Pedro Mejia, District 32 (redistricted into District 33; lost party endorsement)
Paul D. Moriarty, District 4 (running for State Senate)
Gabriela Mosquera, District 4
Raj Mukherji, District 33 (redistricted into District 32; running for State Senate)
Britnee Timberlake, District 34 (running for State Senate)

Republican
John Catalano, District 10 (running for Mayor of Brick Township)
DeAnne DeFuccio, District 39
DiAnne Gove, District 9 (lost party endorsement)
Kevin J. Rooney, District 40
Parker Space, District 24 (running for State Senate)
Hal Wirths, District 24

References

2023
General Assembly
New Jersey General Assembly